Mitchell's water monitor (Varanus mitchelli) is a semiaquatic species of monitor lizard in the family Varanidae. The species is native to Australia. The species is native to the Northern regions of Australia, and is on IUCN's Red List as a critically endangered species. They can be distinguished by the orange or yellow stripes along their neck and dark spots along their back. They are mainly carnivorous, and eat small prey such as lizard, birds, and insects.

Etymology
The specific name, mitchelli, as well as the common name, Mitchell's water monitor, are in honor of Australian herpetologist Francis John Mitchell (1929–1970) of the South Australian Museum. The classification Varanus is a Latinization of the Arabic word for monitor lizard, waran. The Mitchell's Water Monitor, as well as other species of Monitors in Australia, are colloquially referred to as goannas in Australia. The name likely came from the word iguana, as the lizards looked like the iguanas of South America to the first European settlers of Australia.

Description
It has a long, slender neck and a pointed head. It is generally dark brown or black and has small yellow and white spots covering the limbs and head, and ocelli with dark centers as well as yellow stripes along its side. The skin is rough, with many wrinkles. Its underside is a light cream color.

Varanus lizards, including V. mitchelli have excellent eyesight, but are "night blind" in the dark. The lizards' retinas do not have rods, the receptor cells for night vision.

Geographic range
Mitchell's water monitor resides along all northern river systems in the Kimberly Region of Western Australia and the Northern Territory. There is no data to suggest that they live on any islands surrounding Australia.

Habitat
V. mitchelli inhabit swamps, lagoons, inland rivers, and other bodies of water and are often found on trees near the water. It prefers to climb trees to shelter in tree hollows or under bark. If disturbed, V. mitchelli will head to the water. V. mitchelli frequently basks on rocks near the water.

Reproduction
Varanus mitchelli is oviparous. V. Mitchelli breed during the dry season, with the females laying eggs between April and June. Clutch sizes have been recorded from 3 to 12. Breeding behaviors are found to be similar to other species of Varanus lizards. They live around 10 years.

In captivity
The Mitchell's water monitor is reported to be nervous and shy. It is rarely kept in captivity. Average clutch sizes for V. mitchelli are between 3-11 eggs, though they can lay up to 20 in captivity. They are found to be easily bred in captivity.

This lizard grows to a over 2ft in length and requires a large bioactive enclosure, recommendations of 8x4x4 ft are not uncommon, especially if attempting to breed. 
Providing a seasonal environment and food to mimic natural behaviors is the best onset for breeding although these requirements can be difficult to achieve and reduces their appearance in captivity.

Diet
Mitchell's water monitor preys on smaller animals of both terrestrial and aquatic origin. Its prey includes: smaller lizards, small mammals, nestling birds, reptile eggs and terrestrial invertebrates (orthopterans, arachnids, beetles etc.). Aquatic prey include: fish, crabs and frogs. Its diet changes seasonally according to flooding during the wet season.

Conservation

Threats 
The current most significant threat to the Mitchell's Water Monitor is the spread of Cane Toads across the Northern Territory in Australia.Toads and frogs are a part of V. Mitchelli's diet, though the Cane Toads are poisonous to many species of Water Monitors, including V. Mitchelli. Cane Toads have become an invasive species in Australia since their introduction to the area in 1935, and Australia is currently facing an overpopulation of Cane Toads, which presents a problem for the species who mistake the poisonous Cane Toads for endemic toads native to Australia that make up the lizards' usual diet. The geographic range of the cane toads completely overlaps the geographic range of V. mitchelli. Not all cane toads are entirely lethal: the smaller ones have non-lethal doses of poison compared to the larger toads, however, the Mitchell's Water Monitor and other monitors will go after the larger toads that contain lethal doses.

Other threats to the Mitchell's Water Monitor include habitat loss due to land clearing, habitat degradation and change due to climate change, and deaths occurring from contact with humans, such as death on roads. V. mitchelli have also been reported to be exported live to be sold in global markets.

Status 
Mitchell's Water Monitor is currently classified as critically endangered according to IUCN's Red List. Its population is decreasing. The decrease of V. mitchelli following the introduction of the Cane Toads has been estimated to be as high as 97% after only three years. At Kakadu National park, almost the entire population of Mitchell's Water Monitor was taken out by the arrival of the cane toads, though a 2020 survey of the area found some individuals of the species. Despite this, the species has persisted at many habitat spots, though as sightings are rare there is no current estimate on the number of individuals in each population of V. mitchelli.

Efforts 
Researches are trying to find ways to make monitor lizards avoid the cane toads. One current strategy is called Conditioned Taste Aversion Therapy, or CTA. This is where the animal associates a certain food with illness. The animal will avoid this food in the future because of the association. Researchers at the University of Sydney offered small cane toads with a non-lethal amount of poison to monitors in an area where the toads haven't reached yet, and found that the monitors who ate the small toads avoided them in the future. These small toads, or "teacher toads" only make the lizards sick, but it is enough to dissuade them from eating the toads again. Other reports of successful CTA  include the use of non-living bait. In order for this prevention strategy to work, scientists would have to identify areas of concentrated biodiversity in order for the results to balance out the cost of the bait. As cane toads march across Australia, scientists believe that releasing smaller toads ahead of the larger ones will increase CTA in lizards, and prevent them from eating the toads that contain a lethal amount of poison.

Other efforts are aimed at protecting the current populations of Mitchell's Water Monitor at sites already occupied by cane toads, as it will be extremely difficult to stop the spread of cane toads.

The Northern Territory Government has set up the Island Arks program to help the conservation of species affected by the cane toads.

References

External links
Zipcodezoo.com
OZ Monitors Photos at Kingsnake.com
Photos at Pbase.com

Further reading
Ávalos, J. de & Martínez Carrión, P. (1997). "Warane". Reptilia (Münster) 2 (5): 16–21. (in German).
Bennet, D.F. (2003). "Australische Warane". Reptilia (Münster) 8 (5): 18–25. (in German).
Bennet, D.F. (2003). "Australian Monitors". Reptilia (Great Britain) (30): 12–19.
Bonetti (2002). 100 Sauri. Milan: Mondadori. 192 pp. (in Italian).
Bustard, H.R. (1970). Australian Lizards. Sydney: Collins. 162 pp.
Cogger, H.G. (2000). Reptiles and Amphibians of Australia, Sixth Edition. Sanibel Island, Florida: Ralph Curtis Publishing. 808 pp.
De Lisle, H.F. (1996). Natural History of Monitor Lizards. Malabar, Florida: Krieger Publishing.
Eidenmüller, B. (2007). "Small monitors in the terrarium". Reptilia (GB) (50): 12–19.
Mertens, R. (1958). "Bemerkungen über die Warane Australiens". Senckenberg. Biol. 39: 229–264. (Varanus mitchelli, new species, p. 256). (in German).
Storr, G.M. (1980). "The monitor lizards (genus Varanus Merrem, 1820) of Western Australia". Records of the Western Australian Museum 8 (2): 237–293.
Swanson, S. (1976). Lizards of Australia. Sydney: Angus & Robertson. 80 pp.
Wilson, Steve; Swan, Gerry (2013). A Complete Guide to Reptiles of Australia, Fourth Edition. Sydney: New Holland Publishers. 522 pp. .

Varanus
Monitor lizards of Australia
Endemic fauna of Australia
Reptiles described in 1958
Taxa named by Robert Mertens